Tworzymirki may refer to the following places in Poland:
Tworzymirki, Lower Silesian Voivodeship (south-west Poland)
Tworzymirki, Greater Poland Voivodeship (west-central Poland)